The Mirador Sport and Cultural Center or simply Mirador is a women's volleyball club, based in Santo Domingo, Distrito Nacional, Dominican Republic.

History
The team was found 1970.

With the help of Cosiri Rodríguez, who became the "Most Valuable Player" at the 2004 Distrito Nacional Superior Tournament, Mirador win the 9th consecutive and 23rd Championship, defeating Los Cachorros in the 7th game of the final series.

The team won in 2006 it's 24 title at the Distrito Nacional Volleyball Tournament.

Mirador participated as CDN Mirador (Centro Deportivo Nacional and Mirador) at the 2008 edition of the Salonpas Cup finishing in 5th place. Bethania de la Cruz earned the Best Attacker award.

For the 2010 FIVB Women's Club World Championship, Mirador was selected as the representative from the NORCECA confederation. The team ended up in 4th place, being defeated by Bergamo in the Bronze medal Match. Brenda Castillo and Annerys Vargas shined for Mirador, earning the Best Libero and Best Blocker awards.

The NORCECA Confederation of Volleyball, selected Mirador to represent the continent at the 2011 FIVB Women's Club World Championship. The club finished in 4th. place after being defeated by the Brazilian team Sollys/Nestle. The team had Jeoselyna Rodríguez as one of the tournament Top Performers.

Squads

Previous

2011
NORCECA representative at the 2011 FIVB Women's Club World Championship squad.
 Head coach:  Wilson Sánchez
 Assistant coach:  Cristian Cruz

Palmares

NORCECA Tournament of Champions Clubs
 1993 Silver Medal

National Championship
 1975

Distrito Nacional Superior Tournament League Championship
 1975, 1976, 1977, 1978, 1979, 1980, 1981, 1982, 1983, 1985, 1989, 1991, 1992, 1993, 1994, 1995, 1996, 1997, 1998, 1999, 2000, 2001, 2002, 2003, 2004, 2006

References 

Dominican Republic volleyball clubs
Volleyball clubs established in 1970